Harald "Hari" Proczyk (born 9 November 1975) is an Austrian racing driver currently competing in the TCR International Series. Having previously competed in the ADAC TCR Germany Series, Blancpain Sprint Series & ADAC GT Masters amongst others.

Racing career

Touring Cars
Proczyk began his career in 1998 in the German Citroën Saxo Cup, he raced there for two seasons finishing 2nd in the standings both years, before switching to the German Touring Car Challenge. In 1999 he switched to the German Formula König championship, he raced there for a single season and finished 16th in the championship standings that year. He switched to German Ford Puma Cup in 2001, he finished 9th in the championship standings in 2002, before switching to the German Ford Fiesta Cup in 2003. While racing in the German Ford Puma Cup that year, he also took part in the Porsche Carrera Cup Germany championship. He raced their up until 2006, finishing 2nd in the championship standings in 2004 & 2005. While racing his last season in the German Ford Fiesta Cup, he also raced in the German Renault Clio Cup, taking 3 wins and 5 podiums on his way to finishing 3rd in Clio Cup standings that season. In 2007 he switched to the German MINI Challenge, racing their for many season up until 2010, taking several wins and podiums as well as finishing 2nd in the standings in 2007, 2008 & 2010.

GT Racing
For 2011 he made the switch to the ADAC GT Masters racing a Mercedes-Benz SLS AMG GT3 for Heico Motorsport, partnering Dominik Baumann and finishing 5th in the standings that year. The duo continued with Heico Motorsport for 2012, finishing 9th in the standings that year. He only made two one-off appearances in 2013 & 2014 before making a full season return to the championship in 2015, where he again finished 5th in the championship standings. In 2012 he switched to the FIA GT3 European Championship, while racing there he also made two one-off appearances in the 2012 British GT Championship. Meanwhile, he had a great season in the FIA GT3 European Championship, only having one retirement and only failing to finish on the podium once, he raced for the Rhino's Leipert Motorsport team in a Lamborghini Gallardo LP600+ GT3 shared with David Mengesdorf. The duo finished 3rd in the standings that year. For 2013 he switched to the FIA GT Series and Blancpain Endurance Series starting the season as a double program with GRT Grasser Racing Team driving a Lamborghini Gallardo LP 560–4. However, they only raced in the first three rounds of the 2013 Blancpain Endurance Series, while still going on to do a full season in the 2013 FIA GT Series, with Proczyk finishing 2nd in the Pro-Am standings that year. In 2014 he stayed in the series, now named Blancpain Sprint Series, again teaming up with Grasser Racing Team and racing an updated Lamborghini Gallardo FL2 partnered by Jeroen Bleekemolen. The pair took several victories and podiums on their way to finishing 3rd in the Pro Cup championship standings that year. Alongside his 2015 ADAC GT Masters program, he also made a one-off appearance in the 2015 International GT Open, as well as entering four races in the 2015 24H Series.

Return to Touring Cars

For 2016 he switched to the new-for-2016 ADAC TCR Germany series, driving a SEAT León Cup Racer for his own team HP Racing. He took his first pole position at the second round of the championship held at Sachsenring, he then went on to take a lights-to-flag victory in the first race of the day. He currently leads the 2016 championship standings.

In June 2016 it was announced that he would race in the TCR International Series, driving a Honda Civic TCR for WestCoast Racing. He took a pole position in a rain hit qualifying session at the Salzburgring, but was giving a two-place grid penalty for Race 1 after having driven out of the pits into the fast lane before the green flag was waved following a brief red flag stoppage. He did however get to keep the 5 points awarded for qualifying on pole position.

Racing record

Complete TCR International Series results
(key) (Races in bold indicate pole position) (Races in italics indicate fastest lap)

References

External links
 
 

1975 births
Living people
British GT Championship drivers
ADAC GT Masters drivers
TCR International Series drivers
Austrian racing drivers
24 Hours of Daytona drivers
24H Series drivers
People from Knittelfeld
Sportspeople from Styria
Nürburgring 24 Hours drivers
TCR Europe Touring Car Series drivers
Porsche Carrera Cup Germany drivers
Hyundai Motorsport drivers